Carex tribuloides, the blunt broom sedge, is a species of flowering plant in the genus Carex, native to the eastern United States, eastern Canada, and Veracruz in Mexico, and introduced in Sweden. It is an important food for soras (Porzana carolina) during their spring migration.

Subtaxa
The following varieties are currently accepted:
Carex tribuloides var. sangamonensis Clokey
Carex tribuloides var. tribuloides

References

tribuloides
Flora of North America
Plants described in 1803